Dry dung fuel (or dry manure fuel) is animal feces that has been dried in order to be used as a fuel source. It is used in many countries. Using dry manure as a fuel source is an example of reuse of excreta. A disadvantage of using this kind of fuel is increased air pollution. In India, it is known as "dung cakes".

Types

Dry dung and moist dung
Dry dung is more commonly used than moist dung, because it burns more easily. Dry manure is typically defined as having a moisture content less than 30 percent.

Dung cakes 

"Dung cakes", made from the by-products of animal husbandry, are traditionally used as fuel in India for cooking food in a domestic hearth called a Chulha. They are made by hand by village women and are traditionally made from cow or buffalo dung. One dung cake of an average size gives 2100 kJ worth of energy. Dung cakes are also known as goitha, uple, kande, gosse or thepdi.

These are the cakes of cow dung molded by bare hands with a curvature to be able to keep stuck to the walls. Once dried they are put in a pile and covered with thatch called bitauda. These bitaudas are visible in parts of rural India albeit with different names. The size and shape of the cake might vary with region. Its also not uncommon to see these cakes directly used in earthen ovens.

This bio-fuel has been used primarily for two reasons: for easy disposal of cow dung and as easily available and cheap fuel.

Human feces 
Human feces can in principle also be dried and used as a fuel source if they are collected in a type of dry toilet, for example an incinerating toilet. Since 2011, the Bill & Melinda Gates Foundation is supporting the development of such toilets as part of their "Reinvent the Toilet Challenge" to promote safer, more effective ways to treat human excreta. The omni-processor is another example of using human feces contained in fecal sludge or sewage sludge as a fuel source.

Benefits

The benefits of using dry animal dung include:
Cheaper than most modern fuels
Efficient
Alleviates local pressure on wood resources
Readily available - short walking time required to collect fuel
No cash outlays necessary for purchase (can be exchanged for other products) 
Less environmental pollution compared to some other fuels
Safe disposal of animal dung
Sustainable and renewable energy source

Countries

Africa

In Egypt dry animal dung (from cows & buffaloes) is mixed with straw or crop residues to make dry fuel called "Gella" or "Jilla" dung cakes in modern times and ""khoroshtof"" in medieval times. Ancient Egyptians used the dry animal dung as a source of fuel. Dung cakes and building crop residues were the source of 76.4% of gross energy consumed in Egypt's rural areas during the 1980s. Temperatures of dung-fueled fires in an experiment on Egyptian village-made dung cake fuel produced 
""a maximum of 640 °C in 12 minutes, falling to 240 °C after 25 minutes and 100 °C after 46 minutes. These temperatures were obtained without refueling and without bellows etc.""
Also, camel dung is used as fuel in Egypt.
 Lisu is the cakes of dry cow dung fuel in Lesotho (see photo)

Mali

Asia

Afghanistan
Bangladesh, dry cow dung fuel is called Ghunte.
China
India, dry buffalo dung is used as fuel and it is sometimes a sacred practice to use cow dung fuel in some areas in India. Cow dung is known as "Gomaya" or "Komaya" in India. Dry animal dung cakes are called upla in Hindi.
Iran, since prehistoric time to modern eras
Iraq, this kind of biofuel is named locally Muttal, and it is made in the shape of a disc made from cow or buffalo dung, with a diameter of 20-30 cm and a thickness of 2-5 cm. It is famous in its manufacture by the  indigenous people of the marshes of Iraq in particular, and the residents of southern and Middle Euphrates of Iraq in general. It is used in the bakery of rice bread, and in grilling fish to form the favorite food of the people of the marshes, which is Tabag bread and grilled fish, and also is used to burn and emit smoke for a day or more to protect humans, animals and plants from harmful insects.  It is stored in the form of heaps, called Gubbah, and is usually mixed with hay in storage, and used in times when there is little fuel. 
Kazakhs dry animal dung is known as "Кизяк" (romanized: kizyak) which is made by collecting dried animal dung on the steppe, wetting it in water then mixing it with straw then making it in discs which were then dried in the sun.  It was used as a source of fuel for the winter and, throughout the summer.
Kyrgyz Republic, dung is used in specially designed home stoves, which vent to the outside
Mongolia, dry cow dung and sheep dung cakes are commonly used as fuel.
Nepal
Pakistan, dried cow/buffalo dung is used as fuel.

Europe

 France in Maison du Marais poitevin in Coulon there is a demonstration of traditional usage of dry dung fuel.

The Americas
Early European settlers on the Great Plains of the United States used dried buffalo manure as a fuel. They called it buffalo chips.
 American officials in Texas are studying using dry cow dung as a fuel
 Pueblo Indians used dry animal dung as a fuel
 In Peru, the Yavari steam ship was fueled by llama dung fuel for several decades.
 Dry dung can be used in the production of celluloid for film.

History
Dry animal dung was used from prehistoric times,
including in Ancient Persia, Ancient Egypt and early modern England. In Equatorial Guinea archaeological evidence has been found of the practice and biblical records indicate animal and human dung were used as fuel.

Air pollution 

The combustion of dried dung cakes has been shown to release many thousands of organic components into gas and aerosol phases, some of which are unique tracers of dung combustion such as cholestanol and coprostanol. Dung cakes are generally a higher emission fuel, with the combustion of cow dung cake samples collected from the Delhi area of India releasing around four times more volatile organic compounds than fuel wood samples. The volatile organic compounds released from cow dung cake combustion have been shown to be significantly more reactive with the hydroxyl radical, with the gases released from the combustion of cow dung cake samples collected from Delhi in India around 120 times more reactive with the hydroxyl radical than the emissions from liquefied petroleum gas. The volatile organic compounds from cow dung cake combustion have also been shown to result in 3-4 times more secondary organic aerosol production than fuel wood and release many more toxic polycyclic aromatic hydrocarbons.

See also

Cook stove

References

External links
Preparing Cow Dung For Fuel

Animal waste products
Feces
Biodegradable waste management
Bioenergy
Biofuels
Fuels
Biomass